Thaon-les-Vosges (before 2022: Capavenir Vosges) is a commune in the Vosges department of northeastern France. The municipality was established on 1 January 2016 and consists of the former communes of Thaon-les-Vosges, Girmont and Oncourt.

Population
The population data given in the table below refer to the commune in its geography as of January 2020.

Notable people 
 

 Noël Fiessinger (1881–1946), physician

See also 
Communes of the Vosges department

References 

Communes of Vosges (department)
States and territories established in 2016